The 1997 SEAT Open was a women's tennis tournament played on indoor carpet courts in Kockelscheuer, Luxembourg that was part of Tier III of the 1997 WTA Tour. It was the second edition of the tournament and was held from 20 October until 26 October 1997. First-seeded Amanda Coetzer won the singles title.

Finals

Singles

 Amanda Coetzer defeated  Barbara Paulus 6–4, 3–6, 7–5
 It was Coetzer's 3rd title of the year and the 12th of her career.

Doubles

 Larisa Neiland /  Helena Suková defeated  Meike Babel /  Laurence Courtois 6–2, 6–4
 It was Neiland's 2nd title of the year and the 63rd of her career. It was Suková's 3rd title of the year and the 82nd of her career.

References

External links
 ITF tournament edition details
 Tournament draws

SEAT Open
Luxembourg Open
1997 in Luxembourgian tennis